The Greater Accra Metropolitan Area (GAMA) is a metropolitan region centered in Ghana's capital Accra. With around five million inhabitants, the metropolitan area is one of the 90 largest agglomerations in the world. The GAMA is largely continuous, but not identical with the Greater Accra Region.

Geography 
The metropolitan region comprises 25 of the total 29 districts within the Greater Accra Region. It borders the Central Region to the west, the Eastern Region to the north, the Shai Osudoku District to the northeast and the Ningo Prampram District to the east.

Included in the metropolitan region are the following districts:

History 
Before the relocation of the capital of the British crown colony Gold Coast from Cape Coast to Accra in 1877, the region was predominantly rural and consisted of fishing and farming settlements. By 1891, the new capital had developed into an urban area with a population of 20,000. With an area of 300 square kilometers within the official city limits, the capital could not absorb the rapid growth in population and economic activity, so urban development spread to the areas located in the surrounding countryside. In these areas, one could subsequently observe a corresponding increase in demand for land, improved infrastructure and jobs, allowing the suburban areas to gradually merge with the capital. At the same time, this led to a rapid change in the geographic and socioeconomic characteristics of these areas. The areas functionally linked to the capital are currently in various stages of urban transformation, with rural settlements on the one hand, whose residents live mainly from agriculture, and "townships" on the other, from which a significant proportion of residents commute to the capital.

Economy 
The Greater Accra Metropolitan Area is by far the most important economic center in Ghana and accounts for more than half of the nation's economic output and more than a quarter of the national workforce.

References 

Metropolitan areas
Geography of Ghana